Alf Nørgaard (30 October 1916 – 15 September 1971) was a Norwegian gymnast. He competed in eight events at the 1952 Summer Olympics.

References

External links
 

1916 births
1971 deaths
Norwegian male artistic gymnasts
Olympic gymnasts of Norway
Gymnasts at the 1952 Summer Olympics
People from Sauda
Sportspeople from Rogaland
20th-century Norwegian people